Ramin is a Palestinian village in the northeastern West Bank, located 15 kilometers east of Tulkarm in the Tulkarm Governorate of the State of Palestine. According to the Palestinian Central Bureau of Statistics, the village had a population of approximately 3,100 inhabitants in mid-year 2006.

History
Ceramics from the early and  late Roman, Byzantine early Moslem, and  Medieval eras have been found here.

During the early  Crusader era, Daniel the Traveller  reported that he saw a church here, identified by local Christians as the burial place of Joseph of Arimathea.  Ḍiyāʼ al-Dīn (1173-1245)  reported that there were   Muslims living in Ramin during his lifetime.

Ottoman era
Ramin, like all of Palestine was incorporated into the Ottoman Empire in 1517. In the 1596  tax registers, it was part of the nahiya ("subdistrict") of Jabal Sami, part of the larger Sanjak of Nablus. It had a population of 9 households, all Muslims. The inhabitants paid a fixed tax rate of 33.3% on agricultural products, including wheat, barley, summer crops, olive trees, goats and beehives, in addition to occasional revenues; a total of 4,930 akçe.

In 1838, Edward Robinson noted it on his travels in the region,  and placed  it in the  Wady esh-Sha'ir administrative region, west of Nablus. In 1870, Victor Guérin described it as a village situated on a high hill with 700 inhabitants. He further noted that the small square in front of the madafeh (guest house) was paved with large slabs of an ancient appearance.

In 1882,  the PEF's  Survey of Western Palestine (SWP) described Ramin as "a village of moderate size, on a hill, with a second knoll to the east, whence its name. It has a few olives beneath it."

British Mandate era
In the 1922 census of Palestine conducted  by the British Mandate authorities, Ramin had a population of 320 Muslims, increasing in the 1931 census to 423 Muslims, living in 113 houses.

In  the 1945 statistics  the population of Ramin was 630 Muslims,  who owned 8,868  dunams of land  according to an official land and population survey. Of this, 745 dunams were plantations and irrigable land, 2,575 were used for cereals, while 14 dunams were built-up (urban) land.

Jordanian era
In the wake of the 1948 Arab–Israeli War, and after the 1949 Armistice Agreements,  Ramin  came under Jordanian rule.

In 1961, the population of Ramin was  864.

Post 1967
Since the Six-Day War in 1967,  Ramin  has been under Israeli occupation, and according to the Israeli census of that year, the population of Ramin stood at 818, of whom 8 were registered as being refugees  from Israel.

Ramin's population is made up of the families of Salman (30%), Zafer (24%), Hamad (22%) and Zeiden (24%).

Ramin's total land area is about 8,500 dunams, of which 422 dunums is built-up area, about 500 dunams for quarries and 500 dunams for pastures. 470 dunams have been confiscated for the  Israeli settlement of Enav, and for other Israeli causes (such as bypass roads, military positions). Ramin's remaining land is covered by olive and almond orchards.

References

Bibliography

External links
Welcome To Ramin
Survey of Western Palestine, Map 11:    IAA, Wikimedia commons

Tulkarm Governorate
Villages in the West Bank